Nufăru is a commune in Tulcea County, Northern Dobruja, Romania, thought to be the short-lived ancient capital of Kievan Rus, Pereyaslavets, and called Prislav until 1968. It is composed of four villages: Ilganii de Jos, Malcoci, Nufăru and Victoria (formerly Pârlita).

References

Communes in Tulcea County
Localities in Northern Dobruja